Canarium pseudosumatranum is a species of plant in the Burseraceae family. It is a tree endemic to Peninsular Malaysia. It is threatened by habitat loss.

References

pseudosumatranum
Endemic flora of Peninsular Malaysia
Trees of Peninsular Malaysia
Conservation dependent plants
Taxonomy articles created by Polbot